Frank Anderson (1896 – after 1921), known as Ernie Anderson, was a Scottish professional footballer. He made 25 appearances in the Football League during spells with Stockport County and Cardiff City.

Career

He began his career with Irish club Distillery before returning to Scotland to play for Clydebank. His performances prompted Cardiff City manager Fred Stewart to sign him in 1919. He appeared in two friendly matches against Bristol City prior to the start of the 1919–20 season but was unable to break into the first-team again and subsequently left to join  Stockport County.

He made his debut for Stockport on 18 December 1920 in a 0–0 draw with South Shields and went on to make 25 appearances in all competitions during the season as Stockport finished bottom of the Second Division. He rejoined Cardiff City at the start of the following season, making a single appearance in a 1–0 defeat to Oldham Athletic on 10 September 1921. He later finished his professional career with Aberdare Athletic.

Career statistics

References

1896 births
Scottish footballers
Lisburn Distillery F.C. players
Clydebank F.C. (1914) players
Cardiff City F.C. players
Stockport County F.C. players
Aberdare Athletic F.C. players
English Football League players
Southern Football League players
Year of death missing
Association football wing halves